The 1st arrondissement of Lyon, France is one of the nine arrondissements of the City of Lyon. It is located below the hill of Croix-Rousse and on the north part of the Presqu'île formed by the Saône and the Rhône, the two rivers in Lyon.

History 
Les pentes (the slopes Croix-Rousse, which were situated in the Franc-Lyonnais, are integrated to the city of Lyon since 1512, when Louis XII decided to build a fortification on the top of the hill Saint-Sébastien (name of Croix-Rousse in the Middle Ages) to defend the city.

The arrondissement was created 24 March 1852 (also the date of the creation of the 5 first arrondissements).

Geography

Area and demographics
Located in the centre of the presqu'île, the 1st arrondissement is the smallest of all the arrondissements de Lyon. Around the place des Terreaux, bars and pubs across the street make the 1st arrondissement one of the more animated the night and days.
 Area: 
1999: 26,861 inhabitants
2005: 28,100 inhabitants
2006: 28,210 inhabitants
2007: 30,024 inhabitants
 Density of

Quarters
The 1st arrondissement of Lyon is composed of four districts :
 Terreaux (around Place des Terreaux)
 Pentes de la Croix-Rousse
 Croix-Paquet
 Quartier Saint-Vincent

Streets
 Boulevard de la Croix-Rousse
 Cour des Voraces
 Montée de la Grande Côte
 Montée des Carmélites
 Passage Thiaffait
 Quai de la Pêcherie
 Quai Saint-Vincent
 Rue Burdeau
 Rue de l'Arbre-Sec
 Rue de la Bourse
 Rue de la République
 Rue des Capucins
 Rue du Bât-d'Argent
 Rue du Sergent Blandan
 Rue Édouard Herriot
 Rue Lanterne
 Rue Pierre DuPont, named for songwriter Pierre Dupont, born in Lyons 1821.
 Rue Royale
 Rue Sainte-Catherine
 Rue René Leynaud, named for the journalist, poet and Resistance fighter, born in Lyons in 1910.

Squares and areas
 Jardin des Chartreux
 Place de la Comédie
 Place Croix-Paquet
 Place Louis Pradel
 Place Sathonay
 Place des Terreaux

Administration 
The city hall is managed since 2001 by Nathalie Perrin-Gilbert (Parti socialiste).

Monuments 
 Lyon City Hall
 Palace St Pierre, with the Musée des Beaux-Arts
 Opéra de Lyon
 Patineur de César
 Les Subsistances
 Amphithéâtre des Trois Gaules
 Église du Bon-Pasteur
 Église Saint-Polycarpe

Equipments and services 
 Lyon City Hall
 Lycée de la Martinière
 Salle Rameau
 Halles de la Martinière

Transports 
 Métro Ligne A  Station served : "Hôtel de ville-Louis Pradel"
 Métro Ligne C  Stations served: "Hôtel de ville-Louis Pradel" and "Croix-Paquet"

Cultural activities 
 Musée des Beaux-Arts de Lyon
 Opéra de Lyon
 Numerous café-théâtres are installed on the pentes de la Croix-Rousse

See also 
Arrondissements of Lyon
 List of the streets in Lyon

References

External links 
 Official site